The Jacksonville Ladies Open was a golf tournament on the LPGA Tour played from 1951 to 1959, and again in 1975. It was played at several different courses in the Jacksonville, Florida area.

Tournament locations

Winners
Jacksonville Ladies Open
1975 Sandra Haynie

Jacksonville Open
1960-74 No tournament
1959 Mickey Wright
1958 Marilynn Smith
1957 Mickey Wright
1956 Mickey Wright
1955 Jackie Pung
1953 Patty Berg
1952 Louise Suggs

Ponte Vedra Beach Women's Open
1951 Babe Zaharias

References

Former LPGA Tour events
Golf in Florida
Sports competitions in Jacksonville, Florida
Recurring sporting events established in 1951
Recurring sporting events disestablished in 1975
1951 establishments in Florida
1975 disestablishments in Florida
Women in Florida